The Middle European League or MEVZA League is a regional volleyball league, established in 2005 and contested by the club teams from the Middle European Volleyball Zonal Association (MEVZA). The most successful teams are ACH Volley (men's edition) and OK Nova KBM Branik (women's edition), with thirteen and four titles, respectively.

The competition is a continuation of the Interleague, which was played in the 1990s before merging into the newly established MEVZA League in 2005.

List of winners (men's)

Seasons

Number of titles

List of winners (women's)

Seasons

Number of titles

References

External links
Official website

European volleyball club competitions
Sports leagues established in 2005
2005 establishments in Europe
Multi-national professional sports leagues